Pike Lake is a lake in Pope County, in the U.S. state of Minnesota.

Pike Lake was named for its stock of pike fish.

See also
List of lakes in Minnesota

References

Lakes of Minnesota
Lakes of Pope County, Minnesota